Iwona Kuczyńska (born 22 February 1961) is a retired tennis player from Poland.

She won one doubles title in 1988, partnering with Martina Navratilova. From 2010 to 2017, she lived in the village of Omice in Czech Republic, with her partner, former Wimbledon champion Jana Novotná.

WTA career finals

Doubles 3 (1 title, 2 runner-ups)

ITF finals

Singles (1–1)

Doubles (6–3)

Head-to-head record
 Chris Evert 0–1
 Arantxa Sánchez Vicario 0–1

References

External links
 
 

Polish female tennis players
1961 births
Living people
Place of birth missing (living people)
LGBT tennis players
Lesbian sportswomen
Polish LGBT sportspeople
20th-century Polish women
21st-century Polish women